Dostojee is a 2021 Indian Bengali-language drama film written and directed by Prasun Chatterjee and produced by Kathak Talkies.

The film won the top prize, the Golden Shika Award, at the Nara International Film Festival for 2022.

Director 
Prasun Chatterjee

Cast  
 Arif Shaikh as Safiqul 
 Asik Shaikh as Palash 
 Jayati Chakraborty
 Anujoy Chattopadhyay
 Swatilekha Kundu

Cinematographer
Tuhin Biswas

Production 
Chatterjee stayed in the village for a year in 2013 and wrote the script. The script for Dostojee was initially rejected by several producers.

Release
In June 2020, Dostojee was one of the five films selected by NFDC to Goes to Cannes'.

The film had its world premiere at the 65th BFI London Film Festival in London. The film had its Bangladeshi premiere at the 20th Dhaka International Film Festival. The film was subsequently screened at film festivals across the globe, including the Göteborg Film Festival, the Jeonju International Film Festival, the Jio MAMI Mumbai Film Festival, the Dharamshala International Film Festival, the International Film Festival of Kerala, The film screened in UAE at the Sharjah International Film Festival and had its American premieres in international competition at the 39th Chicago International Children’s Film Festival. Dostojee was shown at the Nara International Film Festival in Japan later that year, where it was honoured with Golden Sikha Award with that the director received the opportunity to make a film in Japan fully financed and produced by Nara IFF as a part of award.

It was released on 11 November 2022 in Kolkata.

Reception 
Saibal Chatterjee of NDTV gave 4 out of 5 stars and wrote, " The film posits friendship and humankind's capacity for empathy as a bulwark against bigotry but does not lose sight of the harsh reality that surrounds us."

Accolades

Notes

References

External links 
 

2021 films
Bengali-language Indian films
2020s Bengali-language films